is a Japanese historical drama television series starring Shun Oguri as Hōjō Yoshitoki. The series is the 61st NHK taiga drama.

Cast

Starring role
Shun Oguri as Hōjō Yoshitoki. Kōki Mitani pointed out some similarities between him and Michael Corleone.

Hōjō clan
Eiko Koike as Hōjō Masako, Yoshitoki's older sister
Bandō Yajūrō as Hōjō Tokimasa, Yoshitoki's father
Rie Miyazawa as Maki no Kata, a.k.a. Riku, Yoshitoki's stepmother
Kataoka Ainosuke VI as Hōjō Munetoki, Yoshitoki's older brother
Emma Miyazawa as Awa no Tsubone, a.k.a. Mii, Yoshitoki's younger sister
Kentaro Sakaguchi as Hōjō Yasutoki, Yoshitoki and Yae's son
Yurito Mori as Kongō (young Yasutoki)
Momoko Fukuchi as Hatsu, Yasutoki's wife
Kōji Seto as Hōjō Tokifusa, Yoshitoki's younger brother
Mayu Hotta as Hina, a.k.a. Hime no Mae, Yoshitoki's second wife
Takeru Nishimoto (Super Size Me) as Hōjō Tomotoki, Yoshitoki and Hina's son
Rinko Kikuchi as Noe, a.k.a. Iga no Kata, Yoshitoki's third wife
Taisuke Niihara as Hōjō Masamura, Yoshitoki and Noe's son
Tsubasa Nakagawa as Hōjō Masanori, Yoshitoki's half-brother
Rikako Yagi as Kiku, Yoshitoki's half-sister
Ichika Osaki as Aki, Yoshitoki's half-sister
Masaki Murakami as Inage Shigenari, Aki's husband
Hiroyuki Takagishi (Timon D) as Nitta Tadatsune
Kizuki as Tsurumaru (later known as Taira no Moritsuna)
Haruto Satō as young Tsurumaru
Takashi Yamanaka as Hiraga Tomomasa

Minamoto clan (Genji)
Yo Oizumi as Minamoto no Yoritomo, Masako's husband and the first shogun of the Kamakura shogunate.
Masaki Suda as Minamoto no Yoshitsune, Yoritomo's younger brother
Sō Kaku as Benkei
Shizuka Ishibashi as Shizuka Gozen, Yoshitsune's mistress
Tōko Miura as Sato, Yoshitsune's wife
Daichi Kaneko as Minamoto no Yoriie, the second shogun
Sōma Torigoe as Manju (young Yoriie)
Kana Kita as Tsutsuji, Yoriie's wife
Kasumi Yamaya as Setsu, a.k.a. Lady Wakasa, Yoriie's concubine
Sōta Aizawa as Ichiman
Hayato Kakizawa as Minamoto no Sanetomo, the third shogun
Kiara Minegishi as Senman (young Sanetomo)
Konatsu Katō as Chiyo, Sanetomo's wife
Sara Minami as Ōhime
Miyuko Ochii as young Ōhime
Yuno Ōta as Sanman
Kan'ichirō as Kōgyō, commonly known as Kugyō.
Rinto Takahira as Zenzai (young Kōgyō, around 10 years old)
Tsubasa Nagao as Zenzai (young Kōgyō, around 5 years old)
Takaya Sakoda as Minamoto no Noriyori
Shin'ya Niiro as Ano Zenjō
Kaito Kobayashi as Ano Raizen
Yūsaku Mori as Ano Tokimoto
Tetta Sugimoto as Minamoto no Yukiie
Noriko Eguchi as Kame
Songha as Gien
Shinano
Munetaka Aoki as Kiso Yoshinaka
Ichikawa Somegorō VIII as Kiso Yoshitaka
Sayaka Akimoto as Tomoe Gozen
Yū Machida as Imai Kanehira
Kai
Norito Yashima as Takeda Nobuyoshi
Kō Maehara as Ichijō Tadayori

The 13 lords of the Shogun (other than Yoshitoki and Tokimasa)
Jiro Sato as Hiki Yoshikazu
Nakamura Shidō II as Kajiwara Kagetoki
Yoshihiro Nozoe as Adachi Morinaga
Eiji Yokota as Wada Yoshimori
Hideo Kurihara as Ōe no Hiromoto
Takashi Kobayashi as Miyoshi Yasunobu
Hayato Ichihara as Hatta Tomoie
Yasuhiro Ōno as Adachi Tōmoto
Jun'ya Kawashima as Nakahara no Chikayoshi
Isao Nonaka as Nikaidō Yukimasa
B-saku Satō as Miura Yoshizumi, Yoshimura's father

Other eastern samurai and their families
Sagami
Koji Yamamoto as Miura Yoshimura
Tatsuya Kishida as Miura Taneyoshi
Taiga Komie as Komawaka-maru (later known as Miura Mitsumura)
Jun Kunimura as Ōba Kagechika
Kenji Anan as Doi Sanehira
Makiya Yamaguchi as Yamanouchisudō Tsunetoshi
Taka Takao as Okazaki Yoshizane
Suon Kan as Sasaki Hideyoshi
Takahiro Kimata as Sasaki Sadatsuna
Hiroki Ezawa as Sasaki Tsunetaka
Kazuya Masuda as Sasaki Moritsuna
Tsuyoshi Mitera as Sasaki Takatsuna
Hiroaki Hirata as Satake Yoshimasa
Reiya Masaki as Kajiwara Kagesue 
Eishin as Asahina Yoshihide
Masaki Naitō as Wada Yoshinao
Yūdai Hayashi as Wada Yoshishige
Gaku Hosokawa as Wada Tanenaga
Izu
Kazuyuki Asano as Itō Sukechika
Terunosuke Takezai as Itō Sukekiyo
Yui Aragaki as Yae, Yoritomo's first wife and Yoshitoki's first wife.
Keisei Ōta as Sentsurumaru
Zen Kajihara as Zenji, an assassin
Chihiro Yamamoto as Tō
Airi Takahashi as young Tō
Yoshiyuki Tsubokura (Wagaya) as Kudō Suketsune
Takato Yonemoto as Kudō Shigemitsu
Yoshiyuki Yamaguchi as Kawazu Sukeyasu
Kazuya Tanabe as Soga Jūrō
Eishi Ōfuji as Ichiman (young Jūrō)
Shunsuke Tanaka as Soga Gorō
Kōki Kagaya as Hako'ō (young Gorō)
Tateto Serizawa as Ema Jirō, Yae's second husband
Kazutoyo Yoshimi as Tsusumi Nobutō
Takuma Nagao as Tōnai Mitsuzumi 
Musashi
Taishi Nakagawa as Hatakeyama Shigetada
Mei Fukuda as Chie, Yoshitoki's half-sister and Shigetada's wife.
Rairu Sugita as Hatakeyama Shigeyasu
Keiko Horiuchi as Michi
Mitsuko Kusabue as Hiki no Ama
Eiki Narita as Hiki Tokikazu
Kaito as Hiki Munetomo
Bōsō
Kōichi Satō as Kazusa Hirotsune
Nobuto Okamoto as Chiba Tsunetane
Awa
Manabu Ino as Anzai Kagemasu
Kōji Kurosawa as Nagasa Tsunetomo 
Manabu Takeuchi (Kaminari) as Gonzō
Others
Atsushi Nakamura as Oyama Tomomasa
Nao Takahashi as Yūki Tomomitsu
Shin Shimizu as Naganuma Munemasa
Motohiro Niina as Adachi Kagemori
Eriko Aube as Yū
Ayumu as Nakano Yoshinari
Naritada Nishimura as Ogasawara Nagatsune

The imperial court
Toshiyuki Nishida as Emperor Go-Shirakawa, the 77th emperor of Japan
Onoe Matsuya II as Emperor Go-Toba, who initiated Jōkyū War.
Rihito Kikui as young Emperor Go-Toba
Toma Ikuta as Minamoto no Nakaakira
Kyōka Suzuki as Tango no Tsubone
Toshihiro Yashiba as Taira no Tomoyasu
Hajime Yamazaki as Maki Munechika
Subaru Kimura as Prince Mochihito
Tōru Shinagawa as Minamoto no Yorimasa
Chisa Aizawa as Emperor Antoku
Mitsunojō Itō as toddler Emperor Antoku
Takeharu Morimoto as Nakahara no Tomochika
Naoki Tanaka as Kujō Kanezane
Kazunari Murakami as Tosanobō Shōshun
Tomokazu Seki as Tsuchimikado Michichika
Sylvia Grab as Fujiwara no Kaneko
Yūya Kido as Ichijō Takayoshi
Tomoya Hoshi as Fujiwara no Hideyasu
Myung-joo Inoue as Minamoto no Yorimochi
Iori Koshida as Mitora

Taira clan (Heike)
Ken Matsudaira as Taira no Kiyomori
Kyōko Ōtani as Taira no Tokiko
Kotaro Koizumi as Taira no Munemori
Shogo Hama as Taira no Koremori
Kano Ichiki as "Kenshunmon-in" Shigeko
Kaishi Iwao as Taira no Tomomori
Yūto Shimada as Taira no Kiyomune

Northern Fujiwara
Min Tanaka as Fujiwara no Hidehira
Yūsuke Hirayama as Fujiwara no Kunihira
Hiroshi Yamamoto as Fujiwara no Yasuhira
Mayumi Amano as Toku
Jun'ichi Kawanami as Fujiwara no Yorihira
Hiroshi Kobayashi as Kawada Jirō

Others
Ichikawa Ennosuke IV as Mongaku
Tarō Suwa as Mon'yōbō Kakuen
Kazuyuki Aijima as Unkei
Kenichi Ogata as the chief priest of Ganjōju-in.
Koichi Yamadera as Jien
Gene L. Zheng as Chen Heqing, a.k.a. Chin Nakei
Shihō Harumi as a doctor
Shinobu Otake as a Miko
Sayaka Isoyama as Satsuki
Jun Matsumoto as Tokugawa Ieyasu

TV schedule

Highlight

References

External links
 

2022 Japanese television series debuts
2022 Japanese television series endings
Taiga drama
Cultural depictions of Hōjō Masako
Cultural depictions of Minamoto no Yoshitsune
Cultural depictions of Taira no Kiyomori
Cultural depictions of Tokugawa Ieyasu
Television series set in the 12th century
Television series set in the 13th century
Television series set in feudal Japan